In tennis, the 2019 US Open Series was the sixteenth edition of the US Open Series, which comprised a group of hard court tournaments that started on July 22, 2019 in Atlanta and concluded in Winston-Salem on August 25, 2019. This edition consisted of four separate men's tournaments and two women's tournaments, with the Western & Southern Open hosting both a men's and women's event. The series was headlined by two ATP Tour Masters 1000 and two WTA Premier 5 events.

Tournament Schedule

Week 1

ATP – BB&T Atlanta Open

John Isner was the defending champion, but he lost in the second round to Reilly Opelka.

Alex de Minaur won the title, defeating Taylor Fritz in the final, 6–3, 7–6(7–2).

Main Draw Finals

Week 2

ATP – Citi Open (Washington, D.C.)

Alexander Zverev was the two-time defending champion but chose not to defend his title.

Nick Kyrgios won the title, defeating Daniil Medvedev in the final  7–6(8–6), 7–6(7–4).

Main Draw Finals

WTA – Silicon Valley Classic (San Jose)

Mihaela Buzărnescu was the defending champion, but lost to Daria Kasatkina in the first round.

Zheng Saisai won the title, defeating Aryna Sabalenka in the final, 6–3, 7–6(7–3).

Main Draw Finals

Week 3

ATP – Rogers Cup (Montreal)

Rafael Nadal was the defending champion and successfully defended his title by defeating Daniil Medvedev 6−3, 6−0 in the final.

Main Draw Finals

WTA – Rogers Cup (Toronto)

Simona Halep was the defending champion, but she retired in the quarterfinals against Marie Bouzková.

Bianca Andreescu won the title, defeating Serena Williams in the final 3–1, ret., becoming the first Canadian to win the event since 1969.

Main Draw Finals

Week 4

ATP – Western & Southern Open (Cincinnati) 

Novak Djokovic was the defending champion, but lost in the Semifinals to Daniil Medvedev.

Medvedev went on to win his first ATP Masters 1000 title, defeating David Goffin in the final, 7–6(7–3), 6–4.

Main Draw Finals

WTA – Western & Southern Open (Cincinnati) 

Kiki Bertens was the defending champion, but lost in the second round to Venus Williams.

Madison Keys won the title, defeating Svetlana Kuznetsova in the final, 7–5, 7–6(7–5).

Main Draw Finals

Week 5

ATP – Winston-Salem Open 

Daniil Medvedev was the defending champion, but chose not to participate this year.

Hubert Hurkacz won his first ATP Tour title, defeating Benoît Paire in the final, 6–3, 3–6, 6–3.

Main Draw Finals

Weeks 6–7

ATP – US Open (New York)

Novak Djokovic was the defending champion, but he retired in the fourth round against Stan Wawrinka. 

Rafael Nadal won the title, defeating Daniil Medvedev in the final, 7–5, 6–3, 5–7, 4–6, 6–4.

Main Draw Finals

WTA – US Open (New York)

Naomi Osaka was the defending champion, but she was defeated in the fourth round by Belinda Bencic. 

Bianca Andreescu won the title, defeating Serena Williams in the final, 6–3, 7–5.

Main Draw Finals

References

External links